Chella Pilli is a 2013 Indian Kannada-language action drama film directed by Saikrishna Kudla and starring Vijay Raghavendra and Aishwarya Nag. The film released on 5 July 2013.

Cast 
Vijay Raghavendra as Hemanth
Aishwarya Nag as Diya
Shobharaj as a police officer
Sadananda Gowda as the chief minister
Naveen D. Padil
Bhojaraj Vamanjoor
Aravind Bolar
 Sathish Bandale
 Thimmappa Kulal
 Sundar Rai Mandara
 Jayaram Acharya
 Santhosh Shetty 
Ashok Shetty

Production 
The film began production in September 2012 and was released after Vijay Raghavendra's stint with Bigg Boss Kannada.

Soundtrack 
The music was composed by Mikku Kavil.

Reception 
A critic from The Times of India wrote that "The director does not impress you either with the script or the narration. The movie neither conveys a message nor entertains you". A critic from Deccan Herald wrote that "This Chella pilli is sure to leave most of the audience scatter-brained!"

Box office 
The film ran in a Mangalore theatre for twenty five days.

References